Diepenbeek Castle (also known as the Rentmeesterij van Alden Biesen) is a castle in Diepenbeek near Hasselt in the province of Limburg, Belgium. The building consists of a 15th-century keep with a 17th-century main block. It was once the establishment of the steward of the nearby Commandery of Alden Biesen, whence the alternative name.

See also
List of castles in Belgium

Castles in Belgium
Castles in Limburg (Belgium)